Harry F. Franke Jr. (1922-2012) was a politician in Wisconsin.

Biography
Franke was born on October 13, 1922, in Milwaukee, Wisconsin. During World War II, he served with the United States Army. Franke received his bachelor's degree from Marquette University and his law degree from University of Wisconsin–Madison. After his legislative service, he practiced law and was a lobbyist. He died on February 4, 2012, in Mequon, Wisconsin.

Political career
Franke was a member of the Wisconsin State Senate from 1953 to 1956. Previously, he was elected to the Wisconsin State Assembly in 1950. He was a Republican.

References

External links
The Political Graveyard

Politicians from Milwaukee
Marquette University alumni
University of Wisconsin Law School alumni
Republican Party Wisconsin state senators
Republican Party members of the Wisconsin State Assembly
Wisconsin lawyers
Military personnel from Milwaukee
United States Army soldiers
United States Army personnel of World War II
1922 births
2012 deaths
Lawyers from Milwaukee
20th-century American lawyers